Damir Botonjič (born 14 September 1981) is a retired Slovenian football goalkeeper.

Club career
Botonjič started his career at local side Svoboda. After one year in Gorica, he signed with Turkish side Gençlerbirliği. The first two seasons he played in the PAF league, appearing in 52 matches. He made his Süper Lig debut in October 2002 against Denizlispor. Next season was his most successful in Turkey. He played in 19 Süper Lig and 5 Turkish Cup matches and had an important role in a successful Uefa Cup run. In February 2005, he signed with Ljubljana. He made 14 appearances in Prva Liga, before leaving for another Ljubljana side, Svoboda. He returned in the second part of the 2008-09 season, making 11 appearances for Livar. On 14 July 2009, he signed a contract with Olimpija Ljubljana.

International career
Botonjič was a member of the Slovenia U21 team. He made his only appearance for Slovenia on 31 March 2004 in a friendly match against Latvia.

Personal life
His elder brother Nedžad, also a goalkeeper, died during a training session in February 2005.

References

External links
Player profile at PrvaLiga 
Player profile at TFF

1981 births
Living people
Footballers from Ljubljana
Slovenian footballers
Association football goalkeepers
Slovenian expatriate footballers
ND Gorica players
Gençlerbirliği S.K. footballers
NK Ljubljana players
NK Svoboda Ljubljana players
NK Ivančna Gorica players
NK Olimpija Ljubljana (2005) players
Süper Lig players
Slovenian PrvaLiga players
Slovenian Second League players
Expatriate footballers in Turkey
Slovenian expatriate sportspeople in Turkey
Slovenia youth international footballers
Slovenia under-21 international footballers
Slovenia international footballers